The 44th International Film Festival of India was held on 20 to 30 November 2013 in Goa.

Winners
Golden Peacock (Best Film): Beatriz's War by Luigi Acquisto and Bety Reis
IFFI Best Director Award: Kaushik Ganguly for Apur Panchali
IFFI Best Actor Award (Male): Silver Peacock Award: Alon Abutbul for "A Place in Heaven"
IFFI Best Actor Award (Female): Silver Peacock Award: Magdalena Boczarska for In Hiding
Silver Peacock Special Jury Award: "Thou Gild'st the Even" by Onur Ünlü (Turkish film)

Special Awards
Life Time Achievement Award Jiri Menzel
IFFI Indian Film Personality of the Year Award: Waheeda Rehman
Centenary Award: Kamaleshwar Mukherjee for Meghe Dhaka Tara

Official selections

Special screenings

Opening film

Closing film

References

External links
 

2013 film festivals
2013 festivals in Asia
International Film Festival of India
2013 in Indian cinema